The Whirlpool Aero Car or Spanish Aero Car is a cable car located in Niagara Falls, Ontario that transports passengers over a section of the Niagara River referred to as the Niagara Whirlpool. The system was designed by Spanish engineer Leonardo Torres Quevedo and has been upgraded several times since 1916 (in 1961, 1967 and 1984). The system uses one car that carries 35 standing passengers over a one-kilometre trip.

Technical specifications

In the event of a power failure, a diesel engine drives a hydraulic pump to pull the carrier back to the loading/unloading terminal. It also has a rescue car which holds four passengers and one operator. The rescue car has so far only been used for training purposes.

The Aero Car is suspended between two Canadian points, though it crosses the Canadian and American borders four times on a full trip. The rapids entering the whirlpool below the Aero Car move at an estimated , and the flow of the water coming through the river is about 2,800 cubic meters per second (623,000 imperial gallons per second) in the summer months, and 1,400 m³/s (300,000 imp gal/s) in the winter months. From the Aero Car, sightseers can see Whirlpool State Park in Niagara Falls, New York, as well as the Robert Moses Niagara Hydroelectric Power Station in Lewiston, New York. From the side or centre of the car, one can view the violent motion of the  whirlpool below. Riders may also see hikers on nature trails and fishermen on both sides of the river.

The car was originally open, but a roof has been added to all later designs. A four-person rescue car is available (a smaller silver car stored at the opposite end in an indoor area), but not used in regular service.

The car operates from 10am to 5pm from the second week of March to the first week of November. Despite the similarities between the Aero Car and ski lifts, it has not been operated in winter since 2004.

Gallery

See also
 Incline railways at Niagara Falls
 Niagara Parks Commission People Mover
 Niagara Whirlpool

References

 Niagara Falls - Spanish Aerocar
 Ride The Air - Whirlpool Aero Car
 Plaque at the entrance

External links

 Niagara Parks webpage for Whirlpool Aero Car
 Location of the whirlpool with photos and web sites related to the area
Images from the Historic Niagara Digital Collections
 Niagara Falls - Spanish Aerocar
 Ride The Air - Whirlpool Aero Car
 Plaque at the entrance

Transport in Niagara Falls, Ontario
Spanish inventions
Tourist attractions in Niagara Falls, Ontario
Aerial tramways in Canada
Crossings of the Niagara River
Niagara Parks Commission
1916 establishments in Ontario
Transport infrastructure completed in 1916